Woke is an American comedy television series co-created by Keith Knight and Marshall Todd and starring Lamorne Morris. The series premiered on Hulu on September 9, 2020. On November 17, 2020, Hulu renewed the series for a second season, which premiered on April 8, 2022. In June 2022, Hulu cancelled the series after two seasons.

Plot
Keef Knight, creator of Toast & Butter, is a black cartoonist on the verge of mainstream success. He prides himself on 'keeping it light' and shies away from taking controversial stances. After being racially profiled by overly aggressive policemen, the traumatized Keef finds that he's able to see and hear inanimate objects talking to him. Now more sensitive to racism, and the everyday microaggressions he'd tried so hard to avoid acknowledging in every situation, Keef must figure out how to maintain his relationships and a career as a 'woke' black man.

The show is live action with animated elements.

Cast 

 Lamorne Morris as Keef, a cartoonist based on cartoonist and co-creator Keith Knight
 Blake Anderson as Gunther, one of Keef's roommates
 T. Murph as Clovis, Keef's best friend and roommate
 Rose McIver as Adrienne, an artist and Keef's girlfriend (season 1)
 Sasheer Zamata as Ayana, a reporter for The Bay Arean who calls Keef out
 Aimee Garcia as Laura Salgado (season 2)

Voice only
 J.B. Smoove as Marker
 Nicole Byer and Eddie Griffin as 40 oz Bottles
 Cree Summer as Paper Bag
 Tony Hale as Butter
 Sam Richardson as Toast
 Jack McBrayer as Sad face
 Cedric the Entertainer as Trashcan
 Keith David as Bible

Episodes

Series overview

Season 1 (2020)

Season 2 (2022)

Production 

Keith Knight serves as the inspiration of the show.

Jay Dyer served as the showrunner for the first season. Anthony King was the showrunner for Season 2.

Release 
Woke was released on Hulu on September 9, 2020. The first trailer was released on August 8, 2020.
As Woke Is being produced by ABC Studios and Sony Pictures Television Studios It Expected to be released on Disney+ internationally as part of the Disney-Sony Deal that means Shows and Movies owned by Sony such as Woke will come Disney+.

Reception

Critical response 
Review aggregator Rotten Tomatoes reported an approval rating of 74% based on 42 reviews, with an average rating of 5.8/10 for the show's first season. The website's critics consensus reads, "Though Woke first season doesn't quite know what it wants to say about racism in America, its solid ensemble—led by a well-cast Lamorne Morris—and some surreal silliness make it a messy conversation worth watching." Metacritic gave the series a weighted average score of 61 out of 100 based on 19 reviews, indicating "generally favorable reviews."

Accolades

See also 
 Wonderfalls
 Dear White People
Woke culture

Notes

References

External links 

2020s American comedy television series
2020 American television series debuts
2022 American television series endings
American comedy web series
American television series with live action and animation
Hulu original programming
Television series by ABC Studios
Television series by Sony Pictures Television
Television series by Stoopid Buddy Stoodios
Television shows based on comic strips
Television shows set in San Francisco